Araguanã is a municipality in the state of Maranhão in the Northeast region of Brazil. The population is 15,551.

References

Municipalities in Maranhão